A Safe Proposition is a 1932 British comedy film directed by Leslie S. Hiscott and starring A. W. Baskcomb, Barbara Gott, Harold French and Austin Trevor. It was made at Twickenham Studios as a quota quickie for release by Fox Film.

Cast
 A. W. Baskcomb as Henry Woodford  
 Barbara Gott as Emily Woodford  
 Harold French as Reggie Holloway  
 Joyce Kirby as Margaret Woodford  
 Austin Trevor as Count Tonelli  
 Alexander Field as Ginger Newton  
 Molly Fisher as Mrs. Newton  
 Henry B. Longhurst as Sergeant Crouch

References

Bibliography
 Chibnall, Steve. Quota Quickies: The Birth of the British 'B' Film. British Film Institute, 2007.
 Low, Rachael. Filmmaking in 1930s Britain. George Allen & Unwin, 1985.
 Wood, Linda. British Films, 1927-1939. British Film Institute, 1986.

External links
 

1932 films
1932 comedy films
1930s English-language films
Films directed by Leslie S. Hiscott
British comedy films
Films set in England
Films shot at Twickenham Film Studios
Quota quickies
British black-and-white films
1930s British films
English-language comedy films